Chalcosyrphus dubius is a species of syrphid fly in the family Syrphidae.

Distribution
Canada, United States.

References

Eristalinae
Insects described in 1926
Diptera of North America
Taxa named by Raymond Corbett Shannon